The Guildford pub bombings occurred on 5 October 1974 when the Provisional Irish Republican Army (IRA) detonated two  gelignite bombs at two pubs in Guildford, Surrey, England. The pubs were targeted because they were popular with British Army personnel stationed at Pirbright barracks. Four soldiers and one civilian were killed. Sixty-five people were wounded.

The bombings

The bomb in the Horse and Groom, thought to have been planted by a "courting couple" who have never been identified, detonated at 8:30 pm, killing a civilian, two members of the Scots Guards and two members of the Women's Royal Army Corps. The Seven Stars was evacuated after the first blast, and a second bomb exploded at 9:00 pm while the pub landlord and his wife searched the pub. The landlord sustained a fractured skull and his wife a broken leg, and five members of staff and one customer who had just stepped outside received less serious injuries.

These attacks were the first in a year-long campaign by an IRA active service unit who became known as the Balcombe Street Gang – who police arrested in December 1975 after the Balcombe Street siege leading to their trial and conviction for other murders and offences. A similar bomb to those used in Guildford, with the addition of shrapnel, was thrown into the Kings Arms pub in Woolwich on 7 November 1974. A soldier and a civilian died in that explosion.

The bombings occurred only five days before the October 1974 United Kingdom general election. As all parties felt obliged to respond to the events, they contributed to the speedy and unchallenged passing of the Prevention of Terrorism Acts in November 1974.

The Guildford Four

The bombings were at the height of the Troubles in Northern Ireland. The Metropolitan Police were under enormous pressure to apprehend the IRA bombers responsible for the attacks in England. In December 1974, the police arrested three men and a woman, later known as the Guildford Four. One of the four, Gerry Conlon, had been in London at the time of the bombings, and had visited his mother's sister, Annie Maguire. A few days after the Guildford Four were arrested, the Metropolitan Police arrested Annie Maguire and her family, including Conlon's father, Patrick "Giuseppe" Conlon – the "Maguire Seven".

The Guildford Four were wrongfully convicted of the bombings in October 1975 and sentenced to life in prison. The Maguire Seven were wrongfully convicted of providing bomb-making material and other support in March 1976 and sentenced to terms varying between four and fourteen years.

The Guildford Four were held in prison for fifteen years, while Giuseppe Conlon died near the end of his third year of imprisonment. All the convictions were overturned years later in the appeal courts after it was proved the Guildford Four's convictions had been based on confessions obtained by torture (as were some Maguire Seven confessions), whilst evidence specifically clearing the Four was not reported by the police.

During the trial of the Balcombe Street Gang in February 1977, the four IRA members instructed their lawyers to "draw attention to the fact that four totally innocent people were serving massive sentences" for three bombings in Woolwich and Guildford. The Balcombe Street Gang were never charged with these offences. The 1993 film In the Name of the Father is based on these events.

Aftermath
The London-based IRA active service unit's next attack was the Woolwich pub bombing on 7 November 1974, two people were killed in this attack, one soldier and a civilian who worked in the pub, over 30 people injured. Two of the Guildford Four were also convicted of this attack.

See also
Chronology of Provisional IRA actions
List of public house topics

References

Sources
 BBC report on the attacks, bbc.co.uk, 5 October 1974; accessed 23 October 2015.
 The Road to Balcombe Street: The IRA Reign of Terror in London – Second Edition by Steven P. Moysey – Author 
 

1974 in England
1974 in military history
1974 murders in the United Kingdom
1970s in Surrey
20th-century mass murder in England
20th-century military history of the United Kingdom
Attacks on bars in the United Kingdom
Building bombings in England
Attacks on buildings and structures in England
Pub bombings
History of the British Army
Improvised explosive device bombings in 1974
Mass murder in 1974
Murder in Surrey
October 1974 crimes
October 1974 events in the United Kingdom
Provisional IRA bombings in England
Pubs in Surrey
Scots Guards
Terrorist incidents in the United Kingdom in 1974
Women's Royal Army Corps soldiers